Intibah was a ship used by the Ottoman Navy as a tugboat and minelayer in World War I.

Built in Glasgow in 1886 as a civilian tugboat, she was purchased by the Ottomans in 1912. In 1914, she was converted into a minelayer at Tersâne-i Âmire. During the Italo-Turkish War, the Balkan Wars and World War I, she was involved in mine laying, mine transport, salvage and transport missions, especially with mines in the Dardanelles. After the Armistice of Mudros in October 1918, she was interned in Istanbul with the rest of the fleet. In November 1922, she was smuggled out of Istanbul, brought to Izmit and placed under the command of the Ankara Government. In October 1923, she entered the service of the Turkish Navy and was renamed to Uyanık. In 1933–34, she was rearmed in Gölcük and her old name was restored. She was commissioned as a minelayer in Izmir until 1936 and then again in Çanakkale. In 1956, she was decommissioned from naval service and towed to Gölcük and sold for civilian use in 1958. Between 1959 and 1964, she was converted into a cargo ship and renamed Ararat M. Okan. At the end of 1997, she was caught while carrying illegal immigrants to Italy, confiscated by the Italian government and sold at auction in November 1998. She was dismantled in Crotone in June 1999.

Design 
The Intibah, built in 1886 by R. Duncan / Co. under the name Warren Hastings in Glasgow, Scotland, at Yard No. 223, was 61.2 metres long, 9.1 metres wide and had a draft of 4.7 metres. Her hull was made of iron. The ship's displacement (nautical) was 616 tons. The ship was powered by two Rankie & Blackmore-built 3-cylinder triple-expansion steam engines fed by steam from two boilers. The engines had 1,670 indicated horsepower and in 1912 could propel the ship to a speed of 12 knots per hour.

Unarmed until 1912, by 1915 she had a crew of 12 officers and 46 sailors, and was armed with a 76 mm QF Krupp gun, two QF 47 mm Armstrong guns and 50 naval mines.

Operational history

Ottoman period 
Built in Glasgow in 1886 as a large rescue tug, she was purchased by the Ottomans on 4 March 1912 after 26 years of civilian use. In April 1912, she joined the Ottoman Navy as a rescue tug. Intibah was assigned to lay mines in the Dardanelles against Italian ships on 18 April 1912 during the Italo-Turkish War. In the Balkan Wars, During the Battle of Kaliakra, she took part in support missions in the Ottoman fleet. She met the cruiser , which was damaged in the battle on 21–22 November 1912, at the entrance to the Bosphorus on 22 November and towed it to the Golden Horn where it was repaired. On 10 January 1913, she patrolled the mouth of the Dardanelles during the operation against Greek forces in the Aegean Sea. She was converted to a minelayer in December 1914 in the Tersâne-i Âmire, she remained in this role during World War I.

Intibah took part in minelaying missions during the Dardanelles Campaign. On 9 August 1914, she sailed to the Dardanelles with mines and parts loaded from Istanbul on 14 August 1914. On 15 August 1914, she laid 40 mines arranged in three separate lines between Soğanlıdere and Kepez Feneri as a defense to intercept British ships, and also laid buoys in some places to create the impression that there were different lines in addition to the three lines. On 6 September,  and Intibah were assigned to protect , which was planned to be used as a floating battery. Mesudiye would later be sunk by the British submarine  on 13 December 1914. She laid a fourth row of 29 mines on 24 September, a fifth row of 29 mines between the Anatolian and Rumeli bastions on 1 October and a sixth row of 16 mines on the Anatolian side north of the third line on 9 November. On 26 February 1915 she laid the 10th row of 53 mines between Çimenlik and Degirmenburnu. Intibah then brought the last 25 mines of the reserve depot in Istanbul to Çanakkale on 2 March 1915. At this time the Ottomans were still awaiting the delivery of new mines from Germany. Nusret, which sailed from Nara Burnu at 05:00 on 8 March, laid the last 26 mines in Erenköy Bay as the 11th row.

On 20 October 1915, the submarine  entered the Sea of Marmara and at 09:00 attacked the Ottoman ships Plevne, Gallipoli and Hanefiye, anchored at Şarköy and busy unloading supplies for the Fifth Army, while Intibah was anchored nearby. Plevne and Hanefiye were sunk by torpedo hits, while the torpedo launched at Gallipoli missed. The boilers of Intibah remained deflated and moored during the one-hour battle and did not participate in the battle. On 7 December 1915, the submarine  opened fire on Intibah near Şarköy, and when she returned fire, the submarine dived away; one officer was killed and another was wounded in this engagement. On 8 December, Intibah entered the harbour of Palatya and once again engaged in a surface battle with E11, the submarine was forced to sail away. Two enlisted men from the crew of Intibah were killed in this engagement, and the ship was slightly damaged.

On 26 January, the ship carried a 210 mm German naval gun, which had been purchased for the defence of the Dardanelles and arrived in Istanbul on 1 January 1917, to Çanakkale. On 14 July 1917, she collided with an object under water off Anadolu Karaburnu while carrying coal between Zonguldak and Istanbul. The ship, which suffered significant damage in this collision, which was probably a shipwreck, was run aground to prevent it from sinking. The ship, whose wounds were patched by the salvage teams, was towed to Istanbul for long-lasting repairs.

During the salvage operation, which took place between 22 and 26 January, the turbulence created by the ship's propellers and the sands were cleared and Yavuz Sultan Selim was refloated on the morning of 26 January. , a submarine under the command of Major Geoffrey Saxton White, which was sent into the Bosphorus to sink Yavuz Sultan Selim, arrived at Nara Burnu at 07:00 on 28 January. Rising to periscope depth, the submarine was unable to find its main target as Yavuz Sultan Selim had sailed away two days earlier. Turning round, E14 fired two torpedoes at a Turkish ship (possibly Intibah) observed through its periscope at 08:45 hours: 11 seconds after the launch of the second torpedo, she was rocked by a premature explosion from that torpedo. The gunboat  and Nusret were nearby. She attacked the Durak Reis, but the torpedo she fired hit a shipwreck and exploded. The submarine, which surfaced uncontrollably due to the effect of the explosion and the fire of the Ottoman ships, was badly damaged and dived. Arriving at Kumkale at around noon, E14 was caught by shore battery fire in front of Kumkale while trying to exit the Bosphorus. Taking direct hits, the submarine eventually sank. The ship's commander, three officers and 20 enlisted men were killed, while nine surviving crew members were taken prisoner.

Republican period 
The ship was interned with the rest of the Ottoman fleet in Istanbul in October 1918 after the Armistice of Mudros. In late 1922, Intibah, with the steamships Sagram, Saika, Kasım Paşa, Rehber; Haliç, Beykoz, Darıç and the yacht Galata were smuggled from Haliç and taken to Izmit and she was assigned to Izmit Naval Command, which was established after the recapture of Izmit from occupying forces on 28 June 1921 during the Greco-Turkish War. In October 1923 she entered the service of the Republic of Turkey and was renamed Uyanık. Renamed Intibah in 1933, she was refitted at Gölcük in 1933–34. She served in the Turkish Navy under the İzmir Fortified Position Command until 1936; after the Montreux Agreement, she was assigned to the Dardanelles. Decommissioned from naval service in 1956, she was sold in 1958. Between 1959 and 1964 she was converted into a cargo ship and renamed Ararat M. Okan. The ship was caught at the end of 1997 while carrying illegal immigrants to Italy. She was seized by the Italian government and sold at auction in November 1998. She was dismantled in Crotone in June 1999.

Footnotes

References
 
 
 
 
 
 
 

1886 ships
World War I naval ships of the Ottoman Empire
Minelayers of the Ottoman Navy
Minelayers of the Turkish Navy